Schiller International University (SIU) is a private for-profit university with its main campus and administrative headquarters in Tampa, Florida. It is named after the German playwright and philosopher Friedrich Schiller.

It has campuses on two continents in four countries: Tampa, Paris (France), Madrid (Spain), Heidelberg (Germany). Schiller offers Associate, Bachelor's, and Master's degrees. It also offers online degrees through distance learning.

History
Schiller was founded in 1964 by Dr. Walter Leibrecht as a study-abroad program for Americans living in West Germany. In 1969 the college relocated to Heidelberg.

In 1967, The Global American University, Schiller opened the Madrid and Paris international campuses. Students could move around the two campuses. 

In 1969, Schiller moved its international campus in Germany to Heidelberg and in 1983 they received US acreditation (Accredited Member ACICS). 

In 1991, the university opened its international Campus in Tampa, Florida.

Campuses

Tampa
The main campus is located in Tampa, Florida. The university's Administrative Headquarters and Office of Admissions are in Tampa. The current president is Dr. Manuel Alonso-Puig. At one time it was located in Dunedin, Florida. By 2006, the university moved to East Bay Drive and then Ulmerton Road in Largo. The campus has 21 students and a 12% graduation rate.

Paris
Schiller has a campus in the 15th arrondissement of Paris near the Place de la Convention. The campus has 44 students.

Madrid
The Madrid Campus is located in a historic building on Plaza de la Republica Argentina in Northern Madrid. The Madrid campus specializes in International Business and in International Relations. In addition to US accreditation, the Madrid campus is recognized by the Comunidad de Madrid, allowing students to apply for "homologación." The campus has 74 students.

Heidelberg
The Heidelberg campus was the first Schiller campus and the largest. For years the campus was located in the Villa Krehl in Bergstraße, it also was located at 8 Hölderlinweg in the 1980s in the Altstadt (old city). In the summer of 2012 the campus moved to new facilities in the Bahnstadt. The address of the campus is: Zollhofgarten 1, 69115 Heidelberg, Germany. The campus has 123 students.

Accreditation
Schiller International University was accredited by the Accrediting Council for Independent Colleges and Schools (ACICS). In 2022, the US Department of Education revoked ACICS’s accrediting authority. The US DOE will allow The university to continue operations until February 29, 2024. After that, it must be accredited by another organization.

As of 2015 Schiller students can gain a double degree awarded by Schiller and the University of Roehampton in the United Kingdom, thanks to a bilateral agreement between both universities.

Academics
The Global American University, Schiller has five areas of study that cover, international business, business administration, international relations and diplomacy, management of information technology, hospitality and tourism management and sustainability. English is the language of instruction on all campuses. Students may relocate from campus to campus while continuing their academic program. Schiller features the American pattern of university education.

Notable alumni
 Simon Bowthorpe (born 1964), English 
 Usman Dar, Pakistani politician
 Paras Shah, Ex Crown Prince Of Nepal
 Otto Sonnenholzner (born 1983), 50th Vice President of Ecuador

See also

 List of colleges and universities in Florida
 List of international schools in the United States

References

External links 

 

1964 establishments in West Germany
Education in Heidelberg
Education in Pinellas County, Florida
Educational institutions established in 1964
Friedrich Schiller
For-profit universities and colleges in the United States
Private universities and colleges in Florida
Universities and colleges in London
Universities in Madrid
Universities in Paris
Business schools in France